Militärflugplatz Lodrino  is a military airfield of the Swiss Air Force at Lodrino, Ticino in Switzerland.

History

The airfield was used in the past for fighteraircraft of the type:  de Havilland Venom, Hawker Hunter and de Havilland Vampire and for various liaison aircraft of the Swiss Air Force
The A3 motorway was constructed that it, if necessary, could also be used as  runway. This was also practiced in exercises with the aircraft types mentioned above as.

Current usage 
The airport in Lodrino is not directly operated by the Swiss Air Force, all flight operations in Ticino take place from the AFB Locarno. RUAG Aviation operates there, the centre for maintenance of Helicopters, Propeller Aircraft and UAV  systems. These are: Pilatus PC-6, Pilatus PC-7, Eurocopter EC635 ADS-95 and Pilatus PC-9.

The Swiss Air Force use Lodrino only as alternate aerodrome for Locarno. There are only training flights for the paratroopers who jump out of the PC-6 Turbo Porter over Lodrino and get picked up there for the next jump. The airport is normally enabled only for military aircraft, only in case of maintenance, it is allowed to handle civilian air traffic. The interior of the tower was completely dismantled in 2010

See also 
 RUAG
 Military significance of Switzerlands Motorways

References

External links
Geschäft Ansehen Question about future of Lodrino from  1995 

Airports in Switzerland
Buildings and structures in Ticino
Transport in Ticino
Military airbases in Switzerland